Selinsgrove Speedway (nicknamed The Fastest Half-Mile on The East Coast, Auto Racing's Showcase since 1946) is a  high-banked clay dirt oval south of Selinsgrove, Pennsylvania.

Website 
Speedway History 
Speedway Records

History
Selinsgrove Speedway was built in 1945 under the supervision of Joie Chitwood, a Hollywood stunt man and race car driver from Denison, Texas. The land had previously been a family farm owned by the Allison and Davis families of Snyder County. They sold it to the Dauntless Hook and Ladder Volunteer Fire Department of Selinsgrove in 1941 as a permanent home for the fire company's annual carnival. The first race was held on July 20, 1946, as an American Automobile Association-sanctioned event promoted by Sam Nunis. The winner was Bill Holland, who would go on to win the Indianapolis 500 in 1949. Placing second was Red Byron, who won the first NASCAR-sanctioned race ever, held on February 15, 1948, at the Daytona Beach Road Course and would go on to become the first champion of the NASCAR's Strictly Stock division, now known as the Monster Energy NASCAR Cup Series.

The grandstand at Selinsgrove Speedway was constructed in 1948. Still standing as of 2022, the grandstands were built from 175,000 board feet (400 m³) of lumber with a capacity of 5,500 spectators. Lights for night racing were added in 1953 with the first night race held on June 19, 1953.

Selinsgrove Speedway began hosting weekly events in 1950, under the promotion of George "Buster" Keller. Weekly racing continued until 1959, when the action at the track slowed to occasional races. In 1963, weekly racing resumed once again. Chris Economaki, a pioneer of motorsports writing, served as the track announcer during the early 1950s. The track continued to expand its operation over the years and was managed by several promoters including Hall of Fame promoter Jack Gunn(ne John Gunnels), and from 2001 thru 2015 Charlie Paige who directed vast improvements and expansion at Selinsgrove Speedway. New concession stands were built along with new restrooms and V.I.P. facilities. The smaller Selinsgrove Raceway Park was built in the infield in 2001 and the backstretch and turns 1 and 3 were widened in 2006.

As of 2020 the property is still owned by the Selinsgrove Fair Association with racing conducted under the ERS Promotions LLC banner.

With the advent of larger race car haulers, the pit area, formerly located in the infield, was moved to the outside of turn 4 for the 2018 season, improving the view of the track for spectators. In 2020, the United States Auto Club held its first Silvercrown race at the track. It was named the Bill Holland Classic after the track's first winner and it was 74 laps in length as it was the 74th anniversary since his win.

Selinsgrove Open
The track started the sprint car racing special event in 1983. The event was won by 1984 track champion Maynard Yingst. Yingst won the event in 1984 and 1985 before becoming the national championship winning Funny Car crew chief for 1989 NHRA driver Bruce Larson. Several national sprint car drivers have won the event, including Dave Blaney, Sammy Swindell, and Greg Hodnett.

1983 - Maynard Yingst
1984 - Maynard Yingst
1985 - Maynard Yingst
1986 - Don Kreitz, Jr.
1987 - Dave Blaney
1988 - Keith Kauffman
1989 - Doug Wolfgang
1990 - Sammy Swindell
1991 - Johnny Mackison
1992 - Don Kreitz, Jr.
1993 - Todd Shaffer
1994 - Todd Shaffer
1995 - Fred Rahmer
1996 - Fred Rahmer
1997 - Fred Rahmer
1998 - Greg Hodnett
1999 - Fred Rahmer
2000 - Fred Rahmer
2001 - Todd Shaffer
2002 - Lance Dewease
2003 - Stevie Smith
2004 - Greg Hodnett
2005 - Lucas Wolfe
2006 - Chad Layton
2007 - Greg Hodnett
2008 - Todd Shaffer
2009 - Lance Dewease
2010 - Lance Dewease
2011 - Pat Cannon
2012 - Pat Cannon
2013 - Pat Cannon
2014 - Greg Hodnett
2015 - Danny Dietrich
2016 - Lucas Wolfe
2017 - Brian Brown
2018 - Ryan Smith
2019 - Logan Wagner

Racing Series
The following racing series have run events at Selinsgrove Speedway since 1946.

 The All Star Circuit of Champions (ASCoC)
 American Automobile Association (AAA) Sprints
 American Racing Club (ARC) Midgets
 American Racing Drivers Club (ARDC) Midgets
 American Sprint Car Series (ASCS)
 Automobile Racing Club of America (ARCA) Stock Cars
 Central States Racing Association Midgets
 Empire State Sprints, Empire Super Sprints (ESS)
 Modcar Modifieds
 National Auto Racing Association (NARA) Sprints
 National Sprint Tour (NST)
 PASS/IMCA 305 Sprint Cars
 Patriot Sprint Tour (PST)
 Penn-Jersey Sprint Association
 Penn-Mar Racing Association Stock Cars
 Pennsylvania Speedweek
 Race of Champions Modifieds (RoC)
 SCODA Sports Stock Cars
 Super Midget Racing Club (SMRC)
 Super Sportsman
 Tri County Stockcars
 United Racing Club (URC) Limited Sprints
 United Sprint Association
USAC National Midgets
USAC Silver Crown
 World of Outlaws

References

Buildings and structures in Snyder County, Pennsylvania
Dirt oval race tracks in the United States
Motorsport venues in Pennsylvania
Tourist attractions in Snyder County, Pennsylvania